Over the centuries of Islamic history, Muslim rulers, Islamic scholars, and ordinary Muslims have held many different attitudes towards other religions. Attitudes have varied according to time, place and circumstance.

Non-Muslims and Islam 
The Qur'an distinguishes between the monotheistic People of the Book, i.e. Jews, Christians, Sabians and others on the one hand and polytheists or idolaters on the other hand. There are certain kinds of restrictions that apply to polytheists but not to "People of the Book" in classical Islamic law. One example is that Muslim males are allowed to marry a Christian or Jew, but not a polytheist. Muslim women, however, may not marry non-Muslim men.

The Quran told Muslims to discuss the common points between Muslims and non-Muslims. It directs Muslims not to fight with people of the Book.

The idea of Islamic infallibility is encapsulated in the formula, "Islam is exalted and nothing is exalted above it."

Abraham, Moses, Hebrew prophets, and Jesus were all prophets of Islam, but according to Muslim tradition their message and the texts of the Torah and the Gospels were corrupted.

Apostasy in Islam can be punishable by death and/or imprisonment according to some interpretations but they are only found in hadiths and there is nothing in the Quran that commands death penalty for apostate so the issue of apostasy is controversial. W. Heffening states that Shafi'is interpret verse  as adducing the main evidence for the death penalty in Qur'an. Wael Hallaq states the death penalty was a new element added later and "reflects a later reality and does not stand in accord with the deeds of the Prophet." He further states that "nothing in the law governing apostate and apostasy derives from the letter of the holy text." There are also interpretations according to which apostates are not executed nor punished, and there is freedom of religion.

In the 7th century text Concerning Heresy, the Christian scholar John of Damascus named Islam as Christological heresy, referring to it as the "heresy of the Ishmaelites". The position has remained popular in Christian circles well into the 20th century, by theologians such as the Congregationalist cleric Frank Hugh Foster and the Roman Catholic historian Hilaire Belloc, the latter of who described it as "the great and enduring heresy of Mohammed."

Early Muslim practice 
During the thirteen years that Muhammad led his followers against Mecca and then against the other Arab tribes, Christian and Jewish communities who had submitted to Muslim rule were allowed to worship in their own way and follow their own family law, and were given a degree of self-government.

However, the non-Muslim  were subject to taxation (known as ) at a different rate to the Muslim .  also faced economic impediments, restrictions on political participation and/or social advancement based on their non-Muslim status.

Some Jews generally rejected Muhammad's status as a prophet. According to Watt, "Jews would normally be unwilling to admit that a non-Jew could be a prophet." In the Constitution of Medina, Muhammad demanded the Jews' political loyalty in return for religious and cultural autonomy. In every major battle with the Medinans, two local Jewish tribes were found to be treacherous (see ). After Badr and Uhud, the Banu Qainuqa and Banu Nadir (the latter being an ethnic Arab tribe who converted to Judaism, according to the Muslim historian al-Yaqubi), respectively, took up arms against the ummah and were subsequently expelled "with their families and possessions" from Medina.

However, this incident does not imply that Jews in general rejected Muhammad's constitution. One Yemenite Jewish document, found in the Cairo Genizah, claims that many Jews had not only accepted Muhammad as a prophet, but even desecrated Sabbath in order to join Muhammad in his struggle; historians suggest that this document, called  (Muhammad's Writ of Protection), may have been fabricated by Yemenite Jews for the purpose of self-defence. Still, some Yemeni Jews considered Muhammad a true prophet, including Natan'el al-Fayyumi, a major 12th century rabbi who incorporated various Shia doctrines into his view of Judaism.

The Syriac Patriarch Ishôyahb III wrote in his correspondence to Simeon of Rewardashir, "As for the Arabs, to whom God has at this time given rule (shultãnâ) over the world, you know well how they act toward us. Not only do they not oppose Christianity, but they praise our faith, honour the priests and saints of our Lord, and give aid to the churches and monasteries."

After Muhammad's death in 632, Islamic rule grew rapidly, encompassing what is now the Middle East, Egypt, North Africa, and Iran. Most of the new subjects were Christian, Jewish, and Zoroastrian, the first two being considered People of the Book. (After some argument, the Zoroastrians were considered People of the Book as well.) Christians, Jews, and Zoroastrians were called , protected persons. As noted above, they could worship, follow their own family law, and own property. People of the Book were not subject to certain Islamic rules, such as the prohibitions on alcohol and pork, but were subject to other restrictions. (They were, however, exempt from the  required of Muslims.) They could be bureaucrats and advisors, but they could never be rulers.

Later Islamic practices 
Under the Ummayads and Abbasids, the Islamic community was increasingly fragmented into various sects and kingdoms, each of which had its own evolving policy towards  and towards conquered polytheists.

Later Islamic conquests

From historical evidence, it appears Tokharistan was the only area of Iran heavily colonized by Arabs, where Buddhism flourished when they arrived and the only area incorporated into the Arab empire where Sanskrit studies were pursued up to the conquest. The grandson of Barmak was the vizier of the empire and took personal interest in Sanskrit works and Indian religions. When the Barmakids were removed from power and their influence disappeared, no further translations of Sanskrit works into Arabic is known until that of Al-Biruni.

With the Ghaznavids and later the Mughals, Islam also expanded further into northern India. Will Durant, in The Story of Civilization, described this as "probably the bloodiest story in history." This approach was not uniform, and different rulers adopted different strategies. The Mughal emperor Akbar, for example, was relatively tolerant towards Hindus, while his great-grandson Aurangzeb was heavily intolerant.

The Buddhists of India were not as fortunate; although Buddhism had been in decline prior to the Muslim invasions, the destruction of monastic universities in the invasions such as Nalanda and Vikramashila were a calamity from which it never recovered. According to one Buddhist scholar, the monasteries were destroyed because they were large, fortified edifices considered threats by Muslim Turk invaders.

The Almohad rulers of Muslim Spain were initially intolerant, and engaged in forced conversions; Maimonides, for example, was forced to masquerade as a Muslim and eventually flee Spain after the initial Almohad conquest.

Comparative religion and anthropology of religion
After the Arab conquest of the Buddhist center of Balkh, a Quranic commentator was denounced for anthropomorphism, a standard attack on those sympathetic to Buddhism. Hiwi al-Balkhi had attacked the authority of Quran and revealed religions, reciting the claims of Zoroastrianism, Christianity and Judaism.

In the early 11th century, the Islamic scholar Abū Rayhān Bīrūnī wrote detailed comparative studies on the anthropology of religions across the Middle East, Mediterranean and especially the Indian subcontinent. Biruni's anthropology of religion was only possible for a scholar deeply immersed in the lore of other nations. He carried out extensive, personal investigations of the peoples, customs, and religions of the Indian subcontinent, and was a pioneer in comparative religion and the anthropology of religion.

According to Arthur Jeffery, "It is rare until modern times to find so fair and unprejudiced a statement of the views of other religions, so earnest an attempt to study them in the best sources, and such care to find a method which for this branch of study would be both rigorous and just." Biruni compared Islam with pre-Islamic religions, and was willing to accept certain elements of pre-Islamic wisdom which would conform with his understanding of the Islamic spirit.

In the introduction to his Indica, Biruni himself writes that his intent behind the work was to engage dialogue between Islam and the Indian religions, particularly Hinduism as well as Buddhism. Biruni was aware that statements about a religion would be open to criticism by its adherents, and insisted that a scholar should follow the requirements of a strictly scientific method. According to William Montgomery Watt, Biruni "is admirably objective and unprejudiced in his presentation of facts" but "selects facts in such a way that he makes a strong case for holding that there is a certain unity in the religious experience of the peoples he considers, even though he does not appear to formulate this view explicitly." Biruni argued that Hinduism was a monotheistic faith like Islam, and in order to justify this assertion, he quotes Hindu texts and argues that the worship of idols is "exclusively a characteristic of the common people, with which the educated have nothing to do."

Biruni argued that the worship of idols "is due to a kind of confusion or corruption." According to Watt, Biruni "goes on to maintain that in the course of generations the origin of the veneration of the images is forgotten, and further that the ancient legislators, seeing that the Veneration of images is advantageous, made it obligatory for the ordinary. He mentions the view of some people that, before God sent prophets, all mankind were idol-worshippers, but he apparently does not presumably held that, apart from the messages transmitted by prophets, men could know the existence and unity of God by rational methods of philosophy." Biruni argued that "the Hindus, no less than the Greeks, have philosophers who are believers in monotheism." Al-Biruni also compared Islam and Christianity, citing passages from the Qur'an and Bible which state that their followers should always speak the truth.

Contemporary Islam 

During the 19th and early 20th centuries, most Islamic states fell under the sway of European colonialists. The colonialists enforced tolerance, especially of European Christian missionaries. After World War II, there was a general retreat from colonialism, and predominantly Muslim countries were again able to set their own policies regarding non-Muslims. This period also saw the beginning of increased migration from Muslim countries into the First World countries of Europe, the UK, Canada, the US, etc. This has completely reshaped relations between Islam and other religions.

In predominantly Muslim countries
Some predominantly Muslim countries allow the practice of all religions. Of these, some limit this freedom with bans on proselytizing or conversion, or restrictions on the building of places of worship; others (such as Mali) have no such restrictions. In practice, the situation of non-Muslim minorities depends not only on the law, but on local practices, which may vary.

Some countries are predominantly Muslim and allow freedom of religion adhering to democratic principles. Of particular note are the following countries:
Indonesia and Malaysia have a significant population from the Hindu, Christian and Buddhist religions. They are allowed to practice their religions, build places of worship and even have missionary schools and organizations but with limitation of such practice. 
In Syria, there are about 2.2 million Christians (10–12% of the population) from about 15 different religious and ethnic sects (Greek Orthodox, Syrian Orthodox, Church of the East, Protestants, Armenians Apostolic and various Catholics, Greek, Syrian, Aremenian, Chaldean, Maronite, Latin), as well as a few dozen Jews, and they have many hundreds of independent privately owned churches and some 15 synagogues. The freedom of religion is well observed by the state law as well as the historical long record of tolerance since the Ummayde caliph days. Christmas and Easter days are official holidays for both the Catholic or Orthodox calendar.
 Pakistan has different electorates for Muslims and non-Muslims, and also two chief justices of Supreme Court of Pakistan were Hindu and Christian after the formation of the country.

Other Islamic nations are not so tolerant of minority religions:

 Saudi Arabia limits religious freedom to a high degree, prohibiting public worship by other religions.
 The Taliban regime in Afghanistan is considered intolerant by many observers. Some ancient Buddhist monuments, like the Buddhas of Bamyan, were destroyed as idolatrous.
 The constitution of the Islamic Republic of Iran recognizes Islam, Christianity, Judaism, and Zoroastrianism as People of the Book and official religions, and they are granted the right to exercise religious freedom in Iran. Five of the 270 seats in parliament are reserved for these three religions. However, the situation of the followers of the Bahá'í Faith, the largest religious minority in the country, is far worse. State sanctioned persecution of Bahá'ís allows them to be attacked and dehumanized on political, religious, and social grounds to separate Bahá'ís from the rest of society. According to Eliz Sanasarian "Of all non-Muslim religious minorities the persecution of the Bahá'ís has been the most widespread, systematic, and uninterrupted." See Religion in Iran and Persecution of Bahá'ís. Also, senior government posts are reserved for Muslims. All minority religious groups, are barred from being elected president. Jewish, Christian and Zoroastrian schools must be run by Muslim principals. Compensation for death paid to the family of a non-Muslim was (by law) less than if the victim was a Muslim. Conversion to Islam is encouraged by entitling converts to inherit the entire share of their parents (or even uncle's) estate if their siblings (or cousins) remain non-Muslim. Iran's non-Muslim population has fallen dramatically. For example, the Jewish population in Iran dropped from 80,000 to 30,000 in the first two decades of the revolution.
 In Egypt, a 16 December 2006 judgement of the Supreme Administrative Council created a clear demarcation between "recognized religions"—Islam, Christianity and Judaism—and all other religious beliefs; the ruling effectively delegitimatizes and forbids the practice of all but these aforementioned religions. The ruling leaves members of other religious communities, including Bahá'ís, without the ability to obtain the necessary government documents to have rights in their country, essentially denying them of all rights of citizenship. They cannot obtain ID cards, birth certificates, death certificates, marriage or divorce certificates, and passports; they also cannot be employed, educated, treated in public hospitals or vote among other things. See Egyptian identification card controversy.

According to Islamic law,  (poll tax) is to be paid by all non-Muslims living in a Muslim state, excluding the weak and the poor, to the general welfare of the state. Also, in his book "Al-Kharaj," Abu Yusuf says, "No  is due on females or young infants." In exchange for the tax, the non-Muslims are required to be given security, provided compensation from the Muslim Exchequer when they are in need, treated on equality with Muslims, and enjoy rights as nationals of the state. Al-Balathiri comments on this saying, "Khaled Ibn Al-Walid, on entering Damascus as a conqueror, offered a guarantee of security to its people and their properties and churches, and promised that the wall of the city would not be pulled down, and none of their houses be demolished. This poll tax is different from the alms tax paid by the Muslim subjects of a Muslim state. Whereas  is compulsory and paid by the tolerated community per head count,  was paid only if one can afford it. Muslims and non-Muslims who hold property, especially land, were required however to pay .

Territorial disputes

One of the open issues in the relation between Islamic states and non-Islamic states is the claim from hardline Muslims that once a certain land, state or territory has been under "Muslim" rule, it can never be relinquished anymore, and that such rule, somewhere in history would give the Muslims a kind of an eternal right on the claimed territory. This claim is particularly controversial with regard to Israel and to a lesser degree Spain and parts of the Balkan and it applies to parts of Kashmir as well.

Islamic views on religious pluralism 
Reference to Islamic views on religious pluralism is found in the Quran. The following verses are generally interpreted as an evidence of religious pluralism:

Surah Al-Ma'idah verse 48 states:

Surah Al-Ankabut verse 46 states:

The Quran criticizes Christians and Jews who believed that their own religions are the only source of truth:

Surah Al-Baqara verse 113 states:

Many Muslims agree that cooperation with the Christian and Jewish community is important but some Muslims believe that theological debate is often unnecessary:

Islam's fundamental theological concept is the belief in one God. Muslims are not expected to visualize God but to worship and adore him as a protector. Any kind of idolatry is condemned in Islam. As a result, Muslims hold that for someone to worship any other gods or deities other than Allah ( (polytheism)) is a sin that will lead to separation from Allah.

Muslims believe that Allah sent the Qur'an to bring peace and harmony to humanity through Islam (submission to Allah). The  ensured security of the lives and property of non-Muslims under the  system. This status was originally only made available to non-Muslims who were "People of the Book" (Christians, Jews, and Sabians (commonly identified with the Mandaeans)), but was later extended to include Zoroastrians, Sikhs, Hindus, and Buddhists.
 had more rights than other non-Muslim religious subjects, but often fewer legal and social rights than Muslims. Some Muslims, however, disagree, and hold that adherents of these faiths cannot be .

 enjoyed some freedoms under the state founded by Muhammad and could practice their religious rituals according to their faith and beliefs. Non-Muslims who were not classified as "people of the book," for example practitioners of the pre-Muslim indigenous Arabian religions, had few or no rights in Muslim society.

Muslims and Muslim theologians attend at many interfaith dialogues, for example at the Parliament of the World's Religions with whom in 1993 also Muslim theologians signed the Declaration Toward a Global Ethic.
 
Religious persecution is also prohibited, although religious persecution in Muslim majority states has occurred, especially during periods of cruel rulers and general economic hardships. Pre-Islamic religious minorities continue to exist in some of their native countries, although only as marginal percentages of the overall population.

Over the centuries, several known religious debates, and polemical works did exist in various Muslim countries between various Muslim sects, as well as between Muslims and non-Muslims. Many of these works survive today, and make for some very interesting reading in the apologetics genre. Only when such debates spilled over to the unlearned masses, and thus causing scandals and civil strife, did rulers intervene to restore order and pacify the public outcry on the perceived attack on their beliefs.

As for sects within Islam, history shows a variable pattern. Various sects became intolerant when gaining favour with the rulers, and often work to oppress or eliminate rival sects, for example, the contemporary persecution of Muslim minorities in Saudi Arabia. Sectarian strife between Shia and Sunni inhabitants of Baghdad is well known through history.

Views on forms of worship in other religions
The 14th century Sufi saint Abd al-Karim al-Jili stated that all principal religions actually worship Allah in their own way:

 The Infidels; they disbelieve in a lord, because they worship the essence of God which reflects there is no lord over him.
 The Physicists; worshipping the natural properties, which are actually attributes of God.
 The Philosophers; worshipping the seven planets, which represents further names of God.
 The Dualists; worshipping God as the Creator and the One.
 The Magians; worship God in the names of Unity in which all names and attributes past just as fire destroys and transmutes them in their nature.
 The Materialists; denying a creator and instead believe in the eternity of Time. Thus they just believe in his He-ness, in which God is just potentially but not actually creative.
 The Jews.
 The Sabians (Mandaeans).
 The Christians.
 The Muslims.

Although there are different ways to worship God, those who do not worship like it was ordinated by a prophet will suffer in the afterlife. This suffering causes pleasure, because they feel spiritual delight in the way of their worship until they repent and take refuge in God.

The Sunni scholar and mystic Mahmoud Shabestari holds that every religion is in some way worshipping Allah. Even idol-worshippers actually would unconsciously worship him, but they do not recognise, that in reality, there is no other entity than Allah to worship, thus unnecessarily limiting him.

Forced conversion 
Many Muslim scholars believe that Quranic verses such as "Let there be no compulsion in religion: Truth stands out clear from Error" and  show that Islam prohibits forced conversion towards people of any religion.

The meaning of verse 9:5 has however been a subject of discussion amongst other scholars of Islam as well (see At-Tawba 5). This  was revealed in the historical context of a broken treaty between Muslims and a group of idolaters during the time of Muhammad. Regarding this verse, Quranic translator M. A. S. Abdel Haleem writes: "In this context, this definitely refers to the ones who broke the treaty," rather than polytheists generally. In addition, according to Sahih Al-Bukhari although clear orders were given to kill everyone who broke the treaty, Muhammad made a second treaty before entering Mecca and spared even Amar who was responsible for his daughter Rukayya's death and the person who killed his Uncle Hamza.

According to historian Bernard Lewis, forced conversions played a role especially in the 12th century under the Almohad dynasty of North Africa and Andalusia. He is however also of the opinion that other incidents of forced conversions have been rare in Islamic history. He adds that "In the early centuries of Islamic rule there was little or no attempt at forcible conversion, the spread of the faith being effected rather by persuasion and inducement." A few well-known examples of forced conversion are:
 Anusim of Meshhad, Jewish community forced on pain of death to convert in 1839 under Safavid rule. Most continued Jewish practices in secret and many of their descendants returned to Judaism in the early 20th century.
 Francis Bok—Sudanese-American activist, from Christianity; later returned to his Christian faith.
 Steve Centanni and Olaf Wiig—forced to convert at gunpoint by terrorists of the Holy Jihad Brigades.
 Sabbatai Zevi—convert from Judaism, 17th century mystic, pseudo-Messiah and the self-proclaimed "King of Jews." Converted ostensibly of his own free will, while in prison. Although, some speculate that he may have been executed for treason had he not converted. Muslim authorities were opposed to his death.

See also 
Criticism of Islam
Ghazwa-e-Hind
Persecution of Buddhists by Muslims
Islam and Judaism
Christianity and Islam
Mormonism and Islam
Hinduism and Islam
Jainism and Islam
Islam and Sikhism
Islam and antisemitism
Persecution of Shia Muslims
Conversion of non-Muslim places of worship into mosques
Islamic missionary activity
Divisions of the world in Islam
Religious intolerance

Notes

References

External links